Ocypus is a genus of rove beetles in the subfamily Staphylininae.

Selected species
 Ocypus affinis Wollaston, 1864
 Ocypus alfierii (Bernhauer, 1925)
 Ocypus auroguttatus (Cameron, 1932)
 Ocypus aurosericans (Fairmaire, 1891)
 Ocypus baronii (Coiffait, 1982)
 Ocypus cameroni Smetana & Davies, 2000
 Ocypus curtipennis Motschulsky, 1849
 Ocypus cyaneopubens (Reitter, 1913)
 Ocypus festae (Müller G., 1925)
 Ocypus miwai (Bernhauer, 1943)
 Ocypus olens (O. Müller, 1764) - devil's coach-horse 
 Ocypus ophthalmicus (Scopoli, 1763)
 Ocypus quadrimaculatus (Cameron, 1932)
 Ocypus rhaeticus Eppelsheim, 1873
 Ocypus rhoetus Smetana, 2007
 Ocypus sikkimensis (Bernhauer, 1920)
 Ocypus thericles Smetana, 2007
 Ocypus umbro Smetana, 2007
 Ocypus wasmanni (Bernhauer, 1920)
 Ocypus weisei Harold, 1877
 Ocypus zopyrus Smetana, 2007

References
 Biolib
 Fauna Europaea

Staphylininae
Beetles of Europe
Staphylinidae genera